Samuel Schofield Hammersley (22 December 1892 – 28 March 1965) was an industrialist and Conservative Party politician in UK.

Educated Hulme Grammar School, Oldham, and King's College, Cambridge.

In 1915 during World War I he joined East Lancashire Regiment and was wounded at Gallipoli. Transferred as Captain to Tank Corps at its inception.

In 1919 he married Kate Wakley, with whom he had 5 daughters.

In 1922 he joined his father on the board of his cotton mills. Throughout his life fought for jobs and the future for the cotton industry. He wrote a book in 1925 entitled  "Industrial Leadership". He thought that the average British man worked for the satisfaction of working as much as for the money. He was convinced that manufacturing was the backbone of national prosperity. During World War II worked with the Ministry of Supply for tank production.
He built up S. Noton Ltd into the world's largest maker of luggage and handbags and was listed in the Directory of Directors 1946, as Managing Director of 12 companies.

He was elected at the 1924 general election as a Member of Parliament (MP) for Stockport, a two-seat constituency. He held the seat until he stepped down at the 1935 election.

Hammersley returned to the House of Commons three years later as MP Willesden East, after winning a by-election in July 1938. He represented Willesden until his defeat at the 1945 election.

Founding Chairman of the Anglo-Israel Association 1948.

References

External links 
 

1892 births
1965 deaths
Conservative Party (UK) MPs for English constituencies
UK MPs 1924–1929
UK MPs 1929–1931
UK MPs 1931–1935
UK MPs 1935–1945
Members of the Parliament of the United Kingdom for Stockport
British Army personnel of World War I
East Lancashire Regiment soldiers
Royal Tank Regiment officers